Senior Secret Love (Secret Love) is a 2016–2017 Thai television series each presented through one of the three segments entitled My Lil Boy, Puppy Honey and Bake Me Love.

Directed by Weerachit Thongjila and produced by GMMTV together with Housestories 8, the premiere segment My Lil Boy was broadcast on 7 February 2016 to 13 March 2016 and followed by Puppy Honey (20 March 2016 to 24 April 2016), both airing on Sundays on One31 at 14:00 ICT and 15:00 ICT, respectively. Bake Me Love (1 May 2016 to 5 June 2016) meanwhile aired on Sundays on One31 and LINE TV at 15:00 ICT and 17:00 ICT, respectively.

The series was renewed for a second season starting with My Lil Boy 2 which was broadcast on 11 December 2016 to 29 January 2017 and followed by Puppy Honey 2 (18 March 2017 to 6 May 2017). Both segments were also aired on Sundays on One31 and LINE TV.

Synopsis

Season 1 (2016)

My Lil Boy 
Belle (Kanyawee Songmuang) is known for her beauty throughout the whole school and she has always been successful getting the man that she wants. Yet her charms don't seem to work when it comes to a junior boy named S (Korapat Kirdpan) that she has taken a liking to. Determined to get S, Belle asks for the help of her two best friends.

Puppy Honey 
Emma (Nutcharee Horvejkul), a 1st year Arts student and at heart, loves animals, especially cats. Unfortunately, an incident from Emma's past has made her terrified of dogs. Emma unfortunately meets Porsche (Vorakorn Sirisorn) and Pik (President of an animal club), who is a fourth year in Veterinary school. Porsche and his friend Pik invite (basically force) Emma and her friend Rome to become part of their club. But what happens when Emma and Rome start having feelings for the seniors?

Bake Me Love 
Mielle (Wornurai Sakolrat), a baking blogger, falls in love at first sight with Kim (Toni Rakkaen), but her feelings for him change when he insults her baking skills and tells her she should not blog about baking since she clearly doesn't know how to bake well. To get revenge, Mielle crashes Kim's date with his ex-girlfriend, Lita (Oranicha Krinchai) who is still in love with Kim. Things become more complicated when Mielle finds out that Kim is her new next door neighbor and they accidentally share a kiss.

Season 2 (2016–2017)

My Lil Boy 2 

Belle is enjoying her life as a first-year student in university, while S is still in high school. However, now that Belle's attention towards him seem to have decreased, S realizes he has feelings for the girl. S is now the one chasing after Belle and he will do his best to win her back. But it's not as easy as he thinks.

Puppy Honey 2 
Porsche has moved away to pursue an internship, leaving Emma behind. Causing stress on them and their relationship. Porsche meets Friend, a happy and bright girl and Emma meets Night (Perawat Sangpotirat), her brother's friend from high school. Pick is still confused over his sexuality and feelings for Rome. However, Din, an ex-member of Porsche's cat and dog club is becoming extremely close to Rome. Pick insists he doesn't have feelings for Rome, but he feels jealous when Rome is with Din.

Cast and characters

Main

My Lil Boy 
 Korapat Kirdpan (Nanon) as S
 Kanyawee Songmuang (Thanaerng) as Belle

Puppy Honey and Puppy Honey 2 

 Vorakorn Sirisorn (Kang) as Porsche
 Nachjaree Horvejkul (Cherreen) as Emma
 Atthaphan Phunsawat (Gun) as Rome
 Jumpol Adulkittiporn (Off) as Pick

Bake Me Love 
 Toni Rakkaen as Kim
 Sakolrat Wornurai (Four) as Mielle

My Lil Boy 2 
 Korapat Kirdpan (Nanon) as S
 Kanyawee Songmuang (Thanaerng) as Belle
 Jirakit Kuariyakul (Toptap) as Boss

Supporting

My Lil Boy 
 Paveena Rojjindangam (Mildy) as Pang
 Ingkarat Damrongsakkul (Ryu) as Taewin
 Nawat Phumphotingam (White) as Pe
 Supakan Benjaarruk (Nok) as Ne
 Sawanya Liangprasit (Bell) as Aom
 Phatchara Tubthong (Kapook) as Orn

Puppy Honey 
 Phurikulkrit Chusakdiskulwibul (Amp) as Eau
 Phakjira Kanrattanasood (Nanan) as Ping
 Harit Cheewagaroon (Sing) as Din

Bake Me Love 
 Weerayut Chansook (Arm) as San
 Krittanai Arsalprakit (Nammon) as Aek
 Leo Saussay as Rose
 Oranicha Krinchai (Proud) as Lita
 Sutthipha Kongnawdee (Noon) as Wira

My Lil Boy 2 
 Paveena Rojjindangam (Mildy) as Pang
 Wachirawit Ruangwiwat (Chimon) as Toy
 Ingkarat Damrongsakkul (Ryu) as Taewin
 Phatchara Tubthong (Kapook) as Orn
 Nara Thepnupha as Mayrin

Puppy Honey 2 
 Perawat Sangpotirat (Krist) as Night
 Harit Cheewagaroon (Sing) as Din
 Phurikulkrit Chusakdiskulwibul (Amp) as Eau
 Tipnaree Weerawatnodom (Namtan) as Friend

Guest role

Puppy Honey 
 Ployshompoo Supasap (Jan) as Fan (Ep. 1)

My Lil Boy 2 
 Nawat Phumphotingam (White) as Pe

References

External links 
 Senior Secret Love on LINE TV
 GMMTV

2016 Thai television series debuts
2017 Thai television series endings
Television series by GMMTV
One 31 original programming
Television series by Housestories 8